Organic Bondage is the third album by Wild Willy Barrett and only one with Stephen Two-Names released in 1986.

History 
In 1986, having not released an album for 5 years, Barrett teamed up with bassist Stephen Two-Names. Due to Barrett's ethic of making over buying, most of the instruments featured on the album were made by some men in Bristol, credited as "Gnomes". The scratching sound on "Jack O' Diamonds" is a tape of Two-Names singing in the bath dragged across a tape-head.

Once the album had been recorded, Barrett bought loads of sheets of plywood and made 100 wooden sleeves; the yellow coloured insert and record would slide in to the sleeve through the side. Subsequent pressings were released in a standard grey coloured record sleeve although the content of the vinyl, and the label, were the same.

The album's launch was at a pub in Aylesbury.

Most of the material on the album was written by frequent collaborator Eddie Stanton. Stanton had written "The Young and the Free" which had been recorded by Vietnamese Rose and John Otway and would later provide the seminal "Focke Wolfe" for "The Wimp and The Wild". In fact half of the songs on the album were taken from Stanton's abandoned "Please Don't Throw Me To The Christians" album.

Track listing

Personnel
Wild Willy Barrett - vocals, guitar, wood, fiddle
Stephen Two-Names - bass, backing vocals
Paul "Whisky" Ward - engineering, keyboards on "Dream in Colour", "Only the Good Die Young" and "The Late Show"
Michelle Morrison - vocals on "Dream in Colour" and "The Late Show"
Linda Harvey - cover, label, insert
Johnathan Purcell - illustration
Gnomes - condolences for constructing the Organic Bondage instruments

References

1986 albums